Jack Arnold Weyland (born 1940) is a retired professor of physics at Brigham Young University–Idaho (BYU–Idaho) and a member of the Church of Jesus Christ of Latter-day Saints.  He was a prolific and well-known author of fiction for LDS audiences, including many novels and short stories, mostly placed in contemporary settings.  His novel Charly was made into a feature film in 2002.

Biography 

Weyland was born in Butte, Montana.  He graduated from Billings Senior High School and then attended Montana State University where he majored in Physics.  Upon graduating he served a mission for the LDS Church in New York and Pennsylvania.  After completing his mission he went to BYU and received his Ph.D. in Physics.

While attending BYU, Weyland decided to take an elective course in creative writing.  After a few weeks Weyland realized he was in trouble; he was not a very good writer. Weyland said, "The one time I ventured to tell my instructor I wanted to write LDS fiction, he said, 'You’re not serious, are you?' Certainly a fair question based on what he had seen of my writing.  I became discouraged and dropped the course and didn’t think about writing again for several years."

He married Sherry and they had a daughter named Barbara.  After Barbara was born they left BYU and went to South Dakota, where Weyland taught physics at the South Dakota School of Mines and Technology.  While in South Dakota they had four more children, Dan, Brad, Jed, and Josie.

In the summer of 1971 Wayland had the opportunity to work for the BYU physics department doing high-pressure research.  While at BYU Weyland decided to take a correspondence writing course.  "Especially I wanted it to be by correspondence. Never again would I tell anyone face to face that I wanted to write. The course cost me, as I remember it, $37.50. In addition there was the typewriter to rent." Weyland decided that he wanted to write an article for the New Era magazine.

Weyland's first two stories that he sent into New Era were accepted, but his third entry was rejected.  After having this rejection he was done writing, but the next summer he found himself submitting another article to New Era that was accepted.

Each summer Weyland found himself writing in his spare time.  In 1979 he made a goal to write a novel that would be published by October, he finished his first novel, Charly.  After completing his goal of writing a novel Weyland said, "The Lord blesses us richly for any service we give. He helps us discover talents we never know existed within us."  In his writing career, Weyland has published about three dozen books and more than 50 short stories in the New Era.

Although successful in his LDS publications, Weyland has continued to teach physics.  He taught at Ricks College, (now BYU–Idaho) from 1993 to 2005, and has even continued teaching after retirement as a "campus service missionary".  He explained "I enjoyed physics then and still do today. It is, after all, what I spend most of my time doing."  He and his wife have also served as missionaries for the Church Educational System in Long Island, New York and Philadelphia, Pennsylvania.

Weyland also writes a column on science topics for the local newspaper, the Rexburg Standard Journal.

Publications

 
 
 
 
 
 
 
 
 
 
 
 
 
 
 
 
 
 
 
 
 
 
 
 
 
 
 
 
 
 
 
 
 
 
 
 
 
 
 

Hannah's Legacy (2017)

References

External links
Author's official website
https://web.archive.org/web/20041216205521/http://deseretbook.com/authors/author-info?author_id=4865

1940 births
20th-century Mormon missionaries
21st-century Mormon missionaries
American Latter Day Saint writers
American Mormon missionaries in the United States
21st-century American physicists
Brigham Young University–Idaho faculty
Brigham Young University alumni
Church Educational System instructors
Living people
Montana State University alumni
Writers from Billings, Montana
People from Butte, Montana
South Dakota School of Mines and Technology faculty
American columnists
20th-century American novelists
21st-century American novelists
American short story writers
American male novelists
Journalists from South Dakota
Journalists from Montana
American male short story writers
Latter Day Saints from Montana
Latter Day Saints from South Dakota
Latter Day Saints from Idaho
21st-century American non-fiction writers
American male non-fiction writers
20th-century American male writers
21st-century American male writers